The Tower of Agnellu is a Genoese tower on the French island of Corsica, located in the commune of Rogliano (Haute-Corse).

The tower was built at the end of the 16th century. It is one of a series of coastal defences constructed by the Republic of Genoa between 1530 and 1620 to stem the attacks by Barbary pirates.

See also
List of Genoese towers in Corsica

References

Towers in Corsica